Patrick Dean may refer to:

 Patrick Dean (diplomat) (1909–1994), British ambassador
 Patrick Dean (cartoonist) (1976–2021), American cartoonist and illustrator
 Pat Dean (born 1989), American baseball pitcher

See also
 Patrick Deane (footballer) (born 1990), Scottish footballer
 Patrick Deane (professor) (born 1956), Canadian scholar and university administrator